Grasslands Entertainment is a Canadian television production and distribution company based in Calgary, Alberta.

Television production (past and present)
 Complete Rider
 Eat, Shrink and be Merry
 Ocean Wanderer
 Planet Zoo
 The Thirsty Traveler
 The Wine Thief

External links
 Official Site

Television production companies of Canada
Companies based in Calgary